Wasusarma (Assyrian Wassurme or Uassurme, hieroglyphic Luwian wa/i4-su-SARMA-ma-sa) was a neo-Hittite king from Tabal, who ruled from around 740/38–730 BCE. He carried the titles of great king and hero, like his father Tuwati II (middle 8th century BC) before him.

The name Wasusarma is linked to the name of the god Šarruma, who was a Hurrian mountain god.

Wasusarma is mentioned in several hieroglyphic inscriptions from his subjects. But he also left his own inscription in Luwian hieroglyphs. In this inscription, the king of Tabal reports that eight kings were hostile to him, but three were on his side. These three allies were Warpalawa II of Tuwana, Kiyakiya of Šinuḫtu and the chariot warrior (?) Ruwata. The enemy kings, among them lesser and more important, so Wasusarma, assembled in the city of Parzata or Parzuta, which could have been near the western border of Tabal. Wasusarma concentrated his cavalry and occupied his frontier fortresses. The ruler of Parzata then set up his own border line and attacked the king of Tabal sharply. In response to this, Wasusarma and his cavalry invaded the land of Parzata, devastated it and carried large parts of its population, including women and children, home as slaves. Meanwhile, the enemies attacked the Tabali borders, but could not take them. The war lasted three years before Wasusarma was victorious in a great battle and the city of Parzata was finally able to take, after which it was sacked. Wasusarma thanked the weather god Tarhunna, and the gods Šarruma, (DEUS)*198-sa and (DEUS)BOS.*206.PANIS-sa for the victory. The trigger of the armed conflict could have been an expansionist policy of the Tabal kings. In any case, Tabal was the largest and most powerful of those states (Tabal, Atuna, Tuwana, Ištuanda, Ḫupišna and Šinuḫtu), which the Assyrians in their entirety also called Tabal.

Assyrian sources provide more information about Wasusarma (in the form of the name Wassurme). In 738 BC Wasusarma of Tabal became a tributary subject of the Assyrian king Tiglath-pileser III. Wasusarma, however, caused problems as an Assyrian vassal. On the one hand, he refused the requested tribute payments, on the other hand, his title of great king caused problems. Tiglath-pileser III. accused Wasusarma of wanting to equate himself with his Assyrian overlord and demanded that he go to Assyria and appear before the Assyrian king himself. Wasusarma did not obey the order, which is why he was unceremoniously deposed by Assyrian troops. The throne of Tabal then ascended a puppet ruler of the Assyrians, Ḫulli, "son of a no-man" (ruled 730–726 BC)., who was perhaps of civil origin. The great king dynasty of Tabal, to which Wasusarma and his father Tuwati II belonged, came to an end.

Wasusarma is mentioned in several rock inscriptions and steles. These include the rock inscription from Topada, the inscription stone from Suvasa, the inscription from Göstesin and the stelae from Kayseri and Sultanhanı. According to Mark Weeden, "The context for the removal of Wasusarma (Uassurme) from power by the Assyrian king is assumed to have lain in the events depicted in the large inscription of Topada."

This inscription is located near Ağıllı village in Acıgöl district - formerly called Topada - in Nevşehir Province. "The inscription is carved on the flattened surface of a rock that sticks out from the eastern face of a rocky wall of about 5-meter high plateau. It consists of 8 lines, all separated by drawn lines. There was also a short, one-line "scribal inscription" to the right of the main one, which was apparently destroyed sometime before 1986", according to the website Hittite Monuments.

Literature 
 Gwendolyn Leick: Who's Who in the Ancient Near East. Routledge, London 1999, 2002, 
 Trevor Bryce: The World of the Neo-Hittite Kingdoms: A Political and Military History. Oxford University Press: Oxford, New York 2012. 
 Annick Payne: Iron Age Hieroglyphic Luwian Inscriptions. Society of Biblical Literature, Atlanta 2012, 
 Sanna Aro-Valjus: Uassurme, RIA 14, 3. Lieferung (2014), S. 257.

References 

Hittite kings